The following is a list of notable deaths in August 1995.

Entries for each day are listed alphabetically by surname. A typical entry lists information in the following sequence:
 Name, age, country of citizenship at birth, subsequent country of citizenship (if applicable), reason for notability, cause of death (if known), and reference.

August 1995

1
Julián Berrendero, 83, Spanish road racing cyclist who twice won the Vuelta a España.
Phyllis Brooks, 80, American actress and model.
Martha Genenger, 83, German swimmer and Olympian.
Colin Falkland Gray, 80, New Zealand fighter ace during World War II.
Esther Muir, 92, American actress.
Gopalaswami Parthasarathy, 83, Indian journalist, educationist, and diplomat.
Rudolph F. Zallinger, 75, Austrian-Russian artist.

2
Irwin Bazelon, 73, American composer of contemporary classical music.
Thomas Brimelow, Baron Brimelow, 79, British diplomat.
Lillian Bronson, 92, American character actress.
Fred Daly, 83, Australian politician.
Eva Gredal, 68, Danish politician.
Oonagh Guinness, 85, Anglo-Irish socialite, society hostess and art collector.
Yury Iosifovich Koval, 57, Russian author, artist, and screenplay writer, heart attack.
Juan López Moctezuma, 63, Mexican film director and actor.
Brian Smith, 54, Canadian ice hockey player and sportscaster, shot.

3
Lionel Philias Coderre, 80, Canadian politician.
Harry Craft, 80, American Major League Baseball player and manager.
Mary Lena Faulk, 69, American golfer.
Ida Lupino, 77, British-American actress (The Adventures of Sherlock Holmes, High Sierra) and film director (The Hitch-Hiker), stroke.
Alan Mitchell, 72, British forester, dendrologist and botanist.
Edward Whittemore, 62, American novelist.

4
Alejandro Almendras, 76, Filipino politician.
Cal Anderson, 47, American military officer and politician.
Jacques Aubert, 78, Swiss entomologist.
Dick Bartell, 87, American baseball player, Alzheimer's disease.
Jock Carroll, 76, Canadian writer, journalist and photographer.
Jean-Pierre Frisch, 87, Luxembourgian football player.
Antonio Leonviola, 82, Italian screenwriter and film director.
J. Howard Marshall, 90, American billionaire, oil executive, and husband of Anna Nicole Smith.
Kiiti Morita, 80, Japanese mathematician.
Said Ramadan, 69, Egyptian political activist and humanitarian.

5
Agha Hasan Abedi, 73, Pakistani banker.
Fletcher Allen, 90, American jazz saxophonist, clarinetist, and composer.
Menachem Avidom, 87, Israeli composer.
Clarice Blackburn, 74, American actress, cancer.
Allan Bridge, 50, American conceptual artist.
Angelo Brovelli, 84, American NFL football player.
J. Marshall Brown, 68, American politician and insurance agent.
Massimiliano Capuzzoni, 26, Italian rugby player, diving accident.
Mark Colton, 34, British racing driver and software author, racing accident.
Izet Nanić, 29, Bosnian Army brigade commander, killed in action.

6
Hugh Borton, 92, American historian.
André Fleury, 92, French composer, pianist, organist, and pedagogue.
Harold Lever, Baron Lever of Manchester, 81, British barrister and politician.
Nadira, 27, Pakistani film actress and dancer, homicide.
Toney Penna, 87, Italian-American golfer and designer of golf clubs and gear.
George Svendsen, 82, American gridiron football player.
Montri Tramote, 95, Thai musician and scholar, heart failure.

7
David Begelman, 73, American film producer, suicide.
Brigid Brophy, 66, British novelist, multiple sclerosis.
Haim Kaufman, 60, Israeli politician.
Dursley McLinden, 30, Manx actor.
Don Patinkin, 73, American-Israeli monetary economist.
Tom Scott, 77, Scottish poet, editor, and prose writer.
Harold Stewart, 78, Australian poet and oriental scholar.
Maksim Tank, 82, Belarusian Soviet journalist, poet and translator.

8
Kurt Becher, 85, German SS officer who was Commissar of all Nazi concentration camps.
Ronald Beeson, 58, English cricket player.
Fyodor Dyachenko, 78, Russian/Soviet sniper during World War II, credited with 425 kills.
Carol Hughes, 85, American actress.
Herbert Ihlefeld, 81, German Luftwaffe military aviator anf fighter ace.

9
Teodoro Alcalde, 81, Peruvian football player.
Jerry Garcia, 53, American guitarist (The Grateful Dead), heart attack.
Suen Kam Shun, 88, Chinese football player.
Romuald Spasowski, 74, Polis diplomat,  ambassador and defector, cancer.

10
Gijs van Aardenne, 65, Dutch politician, amyotrophic lateral sclerosis.
Leo Apostel, 69, Belgian philosopher.
Donald Bisset, 84, British character actor and children's author.
Thomas Elliot Bowman III, 76, American carcinologist.
Wei-Liang Chow, 83, Chinese mathematician.
Florestan Fernandes, 75, Brazilian sociologist and politician.
Josseline Gaël, 78, French film actress.
Fay Honey Knopp, 76, American Quaker minister, and peace and civil rights advocat.
Marcel Moussy, 71, French screenwriter and television director.
Harishankar Parsai, 72, Indian writer.
Aldo Protti, 75, Italian baritone.
Baba Rexheb, 93, Albanian Islamic scholar and Sufi.
Niilo Ryhtä, 88, Finnish politician.
Tikiri Banda Subasinghe, 81, Sri Lankan statesman.
Ray Whittorn, 83, Australian politician.
Peter Williams, 81, English designer and dance critic, heart attack.

11
Libby Altwerger, 80, Canadian artist and educator.
Karel Berman, 76, Czech composer, opera singer, music educator.
Sam Berman, 88, American caricaturist of the 1940s and 1950s.
Joseph Bermingham, 76, Irish Labour Party politician.
Alonzo Church, 92, American mathematician.
Reg Date, 74, Australian soccer player.
Damon Edge, 45, American musician, heart attack.
Phil Harris, 91, American comedian and actor (The Jungle Book, Robin Hood, The Aristocats), heart attack.
Wilbur Stark, 83, American writer and film, television, and radio producer and director.
Herbert Sumsion, 96, English organist.

12
Bobby Burns, 90, Canadian ice hockey player (Chicago Blackhawks).
Jean Chapel, 70, American country singer and songwriter.
Frank Cvitanovich, 67, Canadian filmmaker.
Louise Lorimer, 97, American actress.
Marty Paich, 70, American arranger, composer, pianist, and bandleader, colorectal cancer.
Bruno Pasquini, 80, Italian racing cyclist.
Achille Togliani, 71, Italian singer and actor.
Felipe Tromp, 77, Governor of Aruba.

13
Alison Hargreaves, 33, British mountain climber, exposure during climb.
Pêr-Jakez Helias, 80-81, Breton stage actor, journalist, author, poet, and writer.
Jan Křesadlo, 68, Czech psychologist, novelist and poet.
Mickey Mantle, 63, American baseball player, liver cirrhosis.
Jesse Thomas, 84, American blues singer.
Hanna Waag, 91, German film actress.

14
Helmut Beumann, 82, German historian.
Labron Harris, 86, American golfer and golf coach.
Frances Margaret McGuire, 95, Australian author, community leader and philanthropist.
Zdeněk Špinar, 79, Czechoslovak paleontologist and author.

15
Erbie Bowser, 77, American blues pianist and singer.
Michael A. Hess, 43, Irish-American lawyer and chief legal counsel to the RNC, complications from AIDS.
Humphrey Moore, 86, British pacifist and journalist.
Reginald Rodrigues, 73, Indian field hockey player and Olympian.
John Cameron Swayze, 89, American news commentator and game show panelist.

16
Brooke Benjamin, 66, English mathematical physicist and mathematician.
Ljubiša Broćić, 83, Serbian football manager.
Irène de Lipkowski, 96, French politician.
Bobby DeBarge, 39, American R&B musician, AIDS related complications.
Oveta Culp Hobby, 90, American lawyer, politician and cabinet member, stroke.
John Lowe, 83, Scottish football player.
J. P. McCarthy, 62, American radio personality, pneumonia.
Leon Moser, 52, American convicted murderer, execution by lethal injection.
Howie Shannon, 72, American basketball player and coach, lung cancer.
António Vilar, 82, Portuguese actor.

17
George Bekefi, 70, American plasma physicist, inventor, and professor at MIT.
Walter Cartier, 73, American boxer and actor.
Mike Condello, 49, American rock musician, producer, and songwriter, suicide.
Wild Bill Davis, 76, American organist, pianist, and arranger.
Helen Singer Kaplan, 66, Austrian-American sex therapist, cancer.
Howard Koch, 93, American screenwriter (Casablanca, Sergeant York, Letter from an Unknown Woman), Oscar winner (1944).
Rollie Miles, 68, Canadian football player.
Julius Monk, 82,  American cabaret impresario.
Jaroslav Papoušek, 66, Czech film director and screenwriter.
Marjorie Sykes, 90, British educator and peace activist in India.
David Warrilow, 60, English actor (Barton Fink, Radio Days, Simon), AIDS-related complications.
Ted Whitten, 62, Australian rules footballer, prostate cancer.

18
Julio Caro Baroja, 80, Spanish anthropologist, historian, linguist and essayist.
Alexander Zeisal Bielski, 82, Belarus leader of the Bielski partisans during World War II.
Philip Hodgins, 36, Australian poet.
Dick Hogan, 77, American actor (Rope).
Alex Joffé, 76, French film director and screenwriter.
James Maxwell, 66, American actor and director.
Helmuth Schlömer, 102, German Wehrmacht general during World War II.
Dmitri Shepilov, 89, Soviet economist, lawyer and politician.
Andrew Wood Wilkinson, 81, Scottish paediatrician.

19
John H. Adams, 80, American National Champion Thoroughbred racing jockey.
Silvio Amadio, 69, Italian film director and screenwriter.
Rollen Henry Anthis, 79, United States Air Force Major General.
Danny Arnold, 70, American producer, writer, comedian, actor and director.
Jean Bocahut, 75, French rower who competed in the 1948 Summer Olympics.
Jack Carter, 87, Australian cricketer.
Robert C. Frasure, 53, American diplomat and ambassador, traffic collision.
William Summer Johnson, 82, American chemist and teacher.
Pierre Schaeffer, 85, French composer, Alzheimer's disease.

20
Maly Delschaft, 96, German actress.
Paul Foster, 75, American gospel singer with The Soul Stirrers.
John Gilmore, 63, American jazz saxophonist, clarinetist, and percussionist.
Bill Kennedy, 76, American professional baseball pitcher.
Von McDaniel, 56, American professional baseball player.
Hugo Pratt, 68, Italian comics creator, colorectal cancer.
Red Rhodes, 64, American pedal steel guitarist, pneumonia.
Vladimír Škutina, 64, Czech writer, playwright, journalist, and television producer, cancer.

21
Sally A. Bailie, 58, English trainer and owner of Thoroughbred racehorses, cancer.
Subrahmanyan Chandrasekhar, 84, Indian astrophysicist, heart attack.
Hal Cihlar, 81, American professional basketball player.
Manfred Donike, 61, German biochemist and cyclist, heart attack.
Anatole Fistoulari, 88, Ukrainian-British conductor.
Sven Höglund, 84, Swedish cyclist.
Nanni Loy, 69, Italian director for film and television, heart attack, cancer.
Len Martin, 76, Australian sports broadcaster.
Ken Rickards, 71, West Indian cricketer.
Robert T. Smith, 77, American World War II fighter pilot and flying ace.
Chuck Stevenson, 75, American racecar driver.

22
Gilles Andruet, 37, French chess player, beaten to death, blunt trauma.
Mohammed Usman Arif, 72, Indian politician.
Johnny Carey, 76, Irish football player and manager.
José Antonio Girón, 83, Spanish Falangist politician.
René Notten, 45, Dutch football player and manager, heart attack.
Stefan Ślopek, 80, Polish microbiologist and immunologist.

23
Jaroslava Bajerová, 85, Czech gymnast who won silver at the 1936 Summer Olympics.
Johan Bergenstråhle, 60, Swedish film director and screenwriter.
Alfred Eisenstaedt, 96, German-American photographer.
Dwayne Goettel, 31, Canadian electronic musician (Skinny Puppy).
Leslie Graves, 35, American actress (Piranha II: The Spawning, Capitol), AIDS-related illness.
Arthur Holt, 81, British politician.
Gordon White, Baron White of Hull, 72, British-American peer and industrialist.
Chen Pixian, 79, Chinese Communist revolutionary and politician.
Cleveland Robinson, 80, American civil rights activist, kidney failure.
Adele Simpson, 91, American fashion designer.
Sylvester Stadler, 84, Austrian commander of the Waffen-SS during Worls War II.

24
Zbyněk Brynych, 68, Czech film director.
Jack Burns, 76, Australian rules footballer.
Gary Crosby, 62, American singer and actor, lung cancer.
Richard Degener, 83, American diver.
Erich Geiringer, 78, New Zealand physician, writer, publisher.
Killer Karl Krupp, 61, Dutch-American professional wrestler, cardioplegia.
Jason McRoy, 23, English mountain bike racer, traffic collision.

25
Johannes Antonsson, 73, Swedish politician.
John S. Badeau, 92, American diplomat, engineer, minister, and scholar.
John Brunner, 60, British sci-fi author, heart attack.
Setsuko, Princess Chichibu, 85, member of the Japanese Imperial Family, heart failure.
Francis Lawrence Jobin, 81, Canadian politician Lieutenant Governor of Manitoba.
Eugene McDowell, 32, American basketball player.
Ludmilla Pajo, 47, Russian-Albanian writer and journalist.
Brede Skistad, 47, Norwegian football player and manager.
Doug Stegmeyer, 43, American rock bassist and vocalist, suicide by gunshot.

26
Antonio Brancaccio, 72, Italian judge, cancer.
John Costello, 51-52, British military historian.
Annie Kriegel, 68, French communist historian.
Olimi III of Toro, 49, Ugandan monarch and 11th Omukama of the Kingdom of Toro.
Ronald White, 56, American musician (The Miracles), leukemia.
Evelyn Wood, 86, American teacher who popularized speed reading.

27
Dick Bentley, 88, Australian comedian and actor, Alzheimer’s disease.
Glennon Patrick Flavin, 79, American prelate of the Roman Catholic Church.
Carl Giles, 78, English cartoonist.
Mary Beth Hughes, 75, American actress.
Big Dee Irwin, 63, American singer and songwriter.
Václav Ježek, 71, Czechoslovakian/Slovak football coach.

28
Earl W. Bascom, 89, American visual artist, rodeo performer, inventor, and actor, heart failure.
Michael Ende, 65, German author (The NeverEnding Story, Momo, Jim Button and Luke the Engine Driver), stomach cancer.
Thomas Gardner Ford, 77, American politician and businessman.
Fritz Pliska, 79, German football player and coach.
Gerard Salton, 68, German-American professor of Computer Science.
Page Smith, 77, American historian, professor, author, and newspaper columnist.
Michael VerMeulen, 38, American journalist and magazine editor of British GQ, drug overdose.

29
Al Akins, 74, American football halfback and defensive back.
Harry Broadhurst, 89, British Royal Air Force commander and flying ace during World War II.
Selma Burke, 94, American sculptor.
Enrique Carreras, 70, Peruvian-Argentine film director, screenwriter and film producer.
Pierre-Max Dubois, 65, French composer of classical music and conductor.
Art Jones, 76, American gridiron football player.
Frank Perry, 65, American film director (David and Lisa, Mommie Dearest, Diary of a Mad Housewife), prostate cancer.
Nanda Primavera, 97, Italian actress.

30
Agepê, 53, Brazilian singer and composer, diabetes.
Fischer Black, 57, American economist, throat cancer.
Carlos de Anda, 87, Mexican sprinter.
Nikolay Kuznetsov, 64, Azerbaijani water polo player.
Sterling Morrison, 53, American guitarist (the Velvet Underground), non-Hodgkin's lymphoma.
Lev Polugaevsky, 60, Belarusian chess Grandmaster, brain cancer.
Adam Wiśniewski-Snerg, 58, Polish science fiction author, suicide.

31
Murray Bornstein, 77, American neuroscientist.
Mildred Coles, 75, American actress.
Barry Lee Fairchild, 41, American convicted murderer, execution by lethal injection.
David Farrar, 87, English actor.
Horst Janssen, 65, German graphic artist and printmaker.
J. Erik Jonsson, 93, American businessman and mayor of Dallas.
Gertrud Luckner, 94, German social worker and anti-Nazi resisister during World War II.
Carmen Mathews, 84, American actress and environmentalist.
A. A. Rahim, 75, Indian politician, freedom fighter, and union minister.
Beant Singh, 73, Indian politician and Chief Minister of Punjab, assassination.
Dilawar Singh Babbar, 25, Indian suicide bomber and assassin of Beant Singh.

References 

1995-08
 08